Veronika Buzhinskaya was a Soviet film actress.

Selected filmography 
 1922 — Dolya ty russkaya, dolyushka zhenskaya
 1926 — Katka's Reinette Apples
 1927 — The Decembrists (film)
 1928 — The Parisian Cobbler
 1963 — An Optimistic Tragedy

References

External links 
 Вероника Бужинская on kino-teatr.ru

Soviet film actresses
1895 births
1983 deaths